The 2014 Heart of Dallas Bowl was an American college football bowl game played on December 26, 2014 at the Cotton Bowl at Fair Park in Dallas, Texas. The fifth edition of the Heart of Dallas Bowl featured the Illinois Fighting Illini against the Louisiana Tech Bulldogs.  The game was played at 1:00 p.m. CST and aired on ESPN. It was one of the 2014–15 bowl games that concluded the 2014 FBS football season.  The game is sponsored by the Zaxby's chicken restaurant franchise and is officially known as the Zaxby's Heart of Dallas Bowl.

Louisiana Tech beat Illinois by a score of 35–18.

This was the second overall meeting between these two teams, with the Bulldogs winning the first matchup in 2012.

Illinois

Illinois came as a team on a series of streaks throughout the season. On the season the Illini had averaged 26.6 points per game but gave up an average of 34 points per game. Illinois can easily be summarized as a Jekyll and Hyde team. During their 6 wins the Illini scored an average of 33.8 points per game, but in their 6 losses they've gave up an average of 41.67 points per game. This was the Illini's first bowl game since 2011.

Louisiana Tech

Louisiana Tech entered the bowl game as the C-USA West Division champs. The Bulldogs won six of their last eight games giving up an average of 20.5 points per game during that stretch. 3 of the Bulldogs five losses come to Top 25 teams.

Game summary
With the win, the Bulldogs won their first bowl game since 2008.

Scoring summary

Source:

Statistics

References

External links
 Game summary at ESPN

Heart of Dallas Bowl
First Responder Bowl
Illinois Fighting Illini football bowl games
Louisiana Tech Bulldogs football bowl games
Heart of Dallas Bowl (December)
Heart of Dallas Bowl 12
Heart of Dallas Bowl (December)
2014 in Texas